San Antonito is a census-designated place  in Socorro County, New Mexico, United States. Its population was 94 as of the 2010 census.

Education
It is within Socorro Consolidated Schools. Socorro High School is the comprehensive high school of the district.

See also

 List of census-designated places in New Mexico

References

External links

Census-designated places in New Mexico
Census-designated places in Socorro County, New Mexico